Navigator Nunatak is a large nunatak in the middle of the head of Aviator Glacier in Victoria Land. Named by the northern party of New Zealand Geological Survey Antarctic Expedition (NZGSAE), 1962–63, because it is a good landmark for navigation and the name is also in association with Aviator, Pilot, and Co-pilot Glaciers, nearby.

Nunataks of Victoria Land
Borchgrevink Coast